Demolicious is a compilation album by American rock band Green Day. It was released on Record Store Day on April 19, 2014. It is a collection of demo versions of songs from their ¡Uno! ¡Dos! ¡Tré! album trilogy. The album also includes the previously unreleased "State of Shock" and an acoustic version of "Stay the Night". It was released on double vinyl, CD, and cassette tape. The cover art was designed by comic book artist Tom Neely with Kristina Collantes.

Theme and composition
Mike Dirnt published the album's cover on his official Instagram account, stating  "this is how ¡Uno!, ¡Dos! and ¡Tré! would have sounded if we were still on Lookout Records".

Critical reception

Fred Thomas at AllMusic notes that the album is much more raw and "more exciting" than the album trilogy that the songs came from. He goes on to state "Though more stripped-down and loose than usual album fare, the tunes on Demolicious end up feeling more direct".

Track listing

Personnel
Band
 Billie Joe Armstrong – lead vocals, guitar
 Mike Dirnt – bass guitar, backing vocals
 Tré Cool – drums
 Jason White – guitar

Production
 Chris Dugan – mixing
Tom Neely, Kristina Collantes - artwork

Charts

References

Green Day compilation albums
Reprise Records compilation albums
2014 compilation albums
Demo albums
Record Store Day releases